The Pimelodidae, commonly known as the long-whiskered catfishes, are a family of catfishes (order Siluriformes).

Taxonomy
The family Pimelodidae has undergone much revision. Currently, it contains about 30 genera and about 90 recognized and known but unnamed species. Wikipedia lists 109 species in this family. The low-eye catfish (previously family Hypophthalmidae), and thus the genus Hypophthalmus, which contains four species, was reclassified with the pimelodids.

This family previously included fish that are now classified under Pseudopimelodidae (previously subfamily Pseudopimelodinae) and Heptapteridae (previously subfamily Rhamdiinae). This family also previously included Conorhynchos conirostris, currently incertae sedis. However, a molecular analysis has shown unequivocal support for monophyly of the individual families and the genus Conorhynchos into a clade called Pimelodoidea, including Pimelodidae + Pseudopimelodidae and Heptapteridae + Conorhynchos.

Some genera have relatively recently been synonymized. Merodontotus and Goslinia are now both included under Brachyplatystoma. Also, Paulicea is now a synonym of Zungaro.

The six main groups within Pimelodidae are Steindachneridion, the Phractocephalus-Leiarius group, the Pimelodus group, the Calophysus group, Zungaro, and the Sorubim group. The Pimelodus group includes Pimelodus, Exallodontus, Duopalatinus, Cheirocerus, Iheringichthys, Bergiaria, Bagropsis, Parapimelodus, Platysilurus, Platystomatichthys, and Propimelodus. The Calophysus group includes the five genera Aguarunichthys, Pimelodina, Calophysus, Luciopimelodus, and Pinirampus.

The relationships within each genus are still being studied. Most genera lack a hypothesis for monophyly.

Distribution
All species of Pimelodidae are found in South America and the lower Isthmian region. Their range reaches from South America and Panama north to southernmost Mexico.

Description
Many long-whiskered catfishes grow to be very large, including the piraiba, Brachyplatystoma filamentosum, reaching about 3 m in length. They have three pairs of barbels, with maxillary barbels that may reach the length of the fish's body. Like many other catfishes, their bodies lack scales. The adipose fin is well developed.

Many species of Pimelodidae have juvenile forms that appear differently from their adult forms in color pattern, as well as body shape. Brachyplatystoma species have specialized pelagic young with greatly elongated barbels and fin filaments, and strongly ornamented pectoral spines. Other large pimelodids, such as Pseudoplatystoma, Sorubim, and Sorubimichthys, whose young inhabit vegetated, marginal waters, have distinctive cryptic coloration patterns and much enlarged caudal and pectoral fins.

Ecology
They are generally bottom-living fish, though some are pelagic and probably filter-feeders. They do not guard their young.

Relationship to humans 
Because of their large size in many species, pimelodids are an important food fish in South America. Many species have been hybridized through the use of hormones in an effort to get even larger fish. This same size factor also makes them very popular for sport fishing.

Pimelodids are a common addition to Amazonian-themed exhibits in zoos and public aquaria.

Despite the looming danger of size in many species, pimelodids remain a popular home aquarium fish. Controversy exists over whether or not many of the larger species should be sold in the hobby because of their adult size. Also, some disagreement occurs over hybrids appearing in the hobby, as well. Many species are hardy and easy to take care of. However, care should have course be taken on what other fish to house pimelodids with, as they do not hesitate to eat other fish that are small enough.

See also
 List of fish families

References

 
Catfish families
Taxa named by Carl H. Eigenmann
Taxa named by Rosa Smith Eigenmann
Extant Oligocene first appearances